ISO-IEC 8802-5 is a joint ISO/IEC standard that defines Token Ring access methods and physical layer specifications.

ISO/IEC 8820
08820-5